The 1895 Delaware football team represented Delaware College—now known as the University of Delaware—as an independent during the 1895 college football season.

Schedule

References

Delaware
Delaware Fightin' Blue Hens football seasons
Delaware football